Flexor digitorum muscle may refer to:

In the hand
 Flexor digitorum profundus muscle
 Flexor digitorum superficialis muscle

In the foot
 Flexor digitorum brevis muscle
 Flexor digitorum longus muscle